Roger Magnus Nordstrand (born 20 May 1973) is a Swedish former football midfielder. He was a squad member for Sweden at the 1991 FIFA World Youth Championship.

References

1973 births
Living people
Swedish footballers
Örgryte IS players
SK Brann players
Halmstads BK players
Association football midfielders
Swedish expatriate footballers
Expatriate footballers in Norway
Swedish expatriate sportspeople in Norway
Allsvenskan players
Eliteserien players
Sweden youth international footballers